The tasseled blenny (Parablennius thysanius) is a species of combtooth blenny native to the Indo-West Pacific. A single specimen was reported in 2013 in the Mediterranean Sea off Antalya, Turkey.
This species reaches a length of  TL.

References

tasseled blenny
Fish of the Indian Ocean
Marine fish of Southeast Asia
tasseled blenny
Taxa named by David Starr Jordan